RFA Wave Duke (A246) was a Wave-class fleet support tanker of the Royal Fleet Auxiliary built at Sir J. Laing & Sons Ltd at Sunderland. She saw service during the Korean War. She was laid up at Devonport on 30 April 1960, and arrived at Bilbao to be scrapped on 25 December 1969.

Wave-class oilers
Tankers of the Royal Fleet Auxiliary
1944 ships